

This is a list of the Indiana state historical markers in Parke County.

This is intended to be a complete list of the official state historical markers placed in Parke County, Indiana, United States by the Indiana Historical Bureau. The locations of the historical markers and their latitude and longitude coordinates are included below when available, along with their names, years of placement, and topics as recorded by the Historical Bureau.  There are 13 historical markers located in Parke County.

Historical markers

See also
List of Indiana state historical markers
National Register of Historic Places listings in Parke County, Indiana

References

External links
Indiana Historical Marker Program
Indiana Historical Bureau

Parke County
Historical markers